Johanneshov is a district in Stockholm located at the intersection of national road 73 and national road 75 in the borough of Enskede-Årsta-Vantör, southern Stockholm, Sweden.

The icehockey arena Hovet is located in Johanneshov, its current formal name taken from its former popular name, and short for "Johanneshovs isstadion".

Slakthusområdet, a former meat packing district, is being developed to an urban city area with small businesses and apartments. The project includes also adjacent areas Gullmarsplan and Globen under the name Vision Söderstaden 2030.

Other major landmarks of the district are the Avicii Arena (formerly named Stockholm Globe Arena and Ericsson Globe) and Tele2 Arena. The football clubs Hammarby and Djurgården are based at Tele2 Arena in Johanneshov, a stadium built in 2013.

References 

Districts of Stockholm